Peter Benjamin Mandelson, Baron Mandelson  (born 21 October 1953) is a British Labour Party politician who served as First Secretary of State from 2009 to 2010. He was President of the Board of Trade in 1998 and from 2008 to 2010.  He is the president of international think tank Policy Network, honorary president of the Great Britain–China Centre, and chairman of strategic advisory firm Global Counsel. Mandelson is often referred to as a Blairite.

From 1985 to 1990, Mandelson served as Labour's Director of Communications. He was one of the first to whom the term "spin doctor" was applied and gained the nickname "the Prince of Darkness" because of his "ruthlessness" and "media savvy". He served as Member of Parliament (MP) for Hartlepool from 1992 to 2004 and held a number of Cabinet positions under Prime Ministers Tony Blair and Gordon Brown. He was the European Commissioner for Trade between 2004 and 2008.

Mandelson was one of several key people responsible for the rebranding of the Labour Party as New Labour before its victory in the 1997 election. He was twice forced to resign from the Cabinet before leaving Parliament to take up an appointment as a European Commissioner. He later rejoined the Cabinet for a third time after being created a life peer, sitting on the Labour benches in the House of Lords. He is the only person to have held the position of First Secretary of State as a Peer.

Early life

Family
Peter Mandelson was born in Hendon, Middlesex, on 21 October 1953, the son of Mary Joyce (née Morrison) and George Norman Mandelson. His father's family were Jewish; his grandfather had founded the Harrow United Synagogue. His father (known as Tony) was the advertising manager of The Jewish Chronicle who was commissioned as an officer in the Royal Dragoons in the Second World War. On his mother's side, Mandelson is a grandson of Herbert Morrison, the London County Council Leader and Labour Cabinet Minister in the Attlee ministry.

Mandelson was raised in Hampstead Garden Suburb. He says of his childhood – "my whole upbringing was framed around the Suburb – my friendships and values".

Education 
Mandelson attended Garden Suburb School, and between 1965 and 1972, Hendon County Grammar School. In 1966 he appeared on stage with the local amateur theatre group, the Hampstead Garden Suburb Dramatic Society, as the eponymous lead in The Winslow Boy.

From 1973 to 1976 he read philosophy, politics and economics at St Catherine's College, Oxford. During his teenage years he was a member of the Young Communist League, but later became a member of the Oxford University Labour Club.

Early career 
In the late 1970s he became Chairman of the British Youth Council. As Chair of the BYC, he was a delegate in 1978 to the Soviet-organised World Festival of Youth and Students in Havana, Cuba. There, with several future Labour Cabinet colleagues, he – together with future IUSY President Hilary Barnard, Charles Clarke, Richard Corbett and Trevor Phillips – successfully frustrated agreement on a distorted Soviet text on youth in the capitalist countries.

He was elected to Lambeth Borough Council in 1979 but stood down in 1982, disillusioned with the state of Labour politics.

Mandelson then worked for some time as a television producer at London Weekend Television on Weekend World, where he formed a friendship with his superior John (now Lord) Birt.

Political career

Labour's Director of Communications 
In 1985, the Labour Party leader Neil Kinnock appointed him as the party's Director of Communications. As Director, he was one of the first people in Britain to whom the term "spin doctor" was applied; he was thus called "the Prince of Darkness".

In 1986 Mandelson ran the campaign at the Fulham by-election in which Labour defeated the Conservative Party. For the 1987 election campaign, Mandelson commissioned film director Hugh Hudson, whose Chariots of Fire (1981) had won an Oscar as Best Picture, to make a party political broadcast promoting Neil Kinnock as a potential prime minister. Tagged "Kinnock – the Movie", it led to the party leader's approval rating being raised by 16% or 19% in polls and was even repeated in another PPB slot. The election, held on 11 June 1987, returned Margaret Thatcher's Conservatives for the third time, although Labour gained 20 seats, and, this time, convincingly pushed the SDP-Liberal Alliance into third place. Opponents termed the Labour Party's election campaign "a brilliantly successful election defeat".

He ceased being a Labour Party official in 1990 when he was selected as Labour candidate for the constituency of Hartlepool, which was then considered a safe seat.

Malcolm Tucker, the fictional character from Armando Iannucci's The Thick of It, is based, in part, on Mandelson.

As an MP
Mandelson was first elected to the House of Commons at the 1992 general election, and made several speeches outlining his strong support for the European Union. Although sidelined during the brief period when John Smith led the party, Mandelson was by now close to two Shadow Cabinet members – Gordon Brown and Tony Blair – each regarded as potential future leaders of the party.

Following Smith's sudden death on 12 May 1994, Mandelson chose to back Blair for the leadership, believing him to be a superior communicator to Brown and played a leading role in the leadership campaign. This created antagonism between Mandelson and Brown, though they were considered allies in the Labour Party. In 1994 Kate Garvey suggested that Mandelson (who was at the time being derided by the trade unions and other Labour factions), should adopt a "nom de guerre" throughout Blair's leadership bid, so that he might conceal his considerable role within the campaign team. Mandelson agreed to be called "Bobby" for the duration and was thanked by Blair using this name in his victory speech.

After becoming a close ally and trusted adviser to Tony Blair, Mandelson was Labour's election campaign director for the 1997 general election, which Labour won decisively.

Minister without Portfolio 
He was appointed as a Minister without Portfolio in the Cabinet Office, where his job was to co-ordinate within government. A few months later, he also acquired responsibility for the Millennium Dome, after Blair decided to go ahead with the project despite the opposition of most of the cabinet (including the Secretary of State for Culture, Media and Sport who had been running it). Jennie Page, the Dome project's chief executive, was abruptly sacked after a farcical opening night. She gave evidence to a House of Commons Select Committee for Culture and Heritage in June 2000. In what was seen as a reference to the close interest in the Dome from Mandelson, known at the time as so-called "Dome Secretary" and his successor Lord Falconer of Thoroton, Page told the committee: "I made several attempts to persuade ministers that standing back from the Dome would be good for them as well as good for the Dome".

In July 1998 he was appointed to the Cabinet as Secretary of State for Trade and Industry; he launched the Millennium Bug And Electronic Commerce Bill and a Competitiveness White paper, which he described, as 'bold, far reaching and absolutely necessary'. He also appointed a "Net Tsar" to lead the UK in what he termed the "new industrial revolution". In 1998 he was appointed a Privy Counsellor.

Mandelson bought a home in Notting Hill in 1996 partly with an interest-free loan of £373,000 from Geoffrey Robinson, a cabinet colleague and millionaire whose business dealings were subject to an inquiry by Mandelson's department. Mandelson contended that he had deliberately not taken part in any decisions relating to Robinson. However, he had not declared the loan in the Register of Members' Interests and resigned in December 1998. Mandelson had also not declared the loan to his building society (the Britannia) although they decided not to take any action, with the CEO stating "I am satisfied that the information given to us at the time of the mortgage application was accurate." Mandelson initially thought he could weather the press storm, but had to resign when it became clear that the Prime Minister thought nothing else would clear the air.

In October 2000 it was reported that Robinson had "accused Peter Mandelson of lying to the Commons about the home loan affair that cost both of them their government jobs."

Secretary of State for Northern Ireland 
He was out of the Cabinet for ten months. In October 1999 he was appointed Secretary of State for Northern Ireland, replacing Mo Mowlam. In his very first speech in the post he mistakenly referred to himself as the "Secretary of State for Ireland." During his tenure he oversaw the creation of the devolved legislative assembly and power-sharing executive and reform of the police service.

On 24 January 2001, Mandelson resigned from the Government for a second time, following accusations of using his position to influence a passport application.

He had contacted Home Office Minister Mike O'Brien on behalf of Srichand Hinduja, an Indian businessman who was seeking British citizenship and whose family firm was to become the main sponsor of the "Faith Zone" in the Millennium Dome. At the time Hinduja and his brothers were under investigation by the Indian government for alleged involvement in the Bofors scandal.

Mandelson insisted he had done nothing wrong and was exonerated by an independent inquiry by Sir Anthony Hammond, which concluded that neither Mandelson nor anyone else had acted improperly.

At the 2001 general election Mandelson was challenged by Arthur Scargill of the Socialist Labour Party and by John Booth, a former Labour Party press officer standing as "Genuine Labour", but Mandelson was re-elected with a large majority. In his victory speech, Mandelson said: "It was said that I was facing political oblivion ... Well, they underestimated Hartlepool and they underestimated me because I am a fighter and not a quitter."

Stepping down as MP 
Despite Labour success in the June 2001 general election, a third Cabinet appointment did not materialise and he indicated his interest in becoming the United Kingdom's European Commissioner when the new Commission was established in 2004. Both of Britain's Commissioners, Neil Kinnock and Chris Patten, were due to stand down. Appointment as a European Commissioner would require his resignation from Parliament precipitating a by-election in his Hartlepool constituency. His appointment was announced in the summer and on 8 September 2004 Mandelson resigned his seat by submitting his name as Steward of the Manor of Northstead. Labour won the subsequent Hartlepool by-election with a much-reduced majority of 2,033 votes (equating to 40.7% of the vote). He was succeeded as MP for Hartlepool by Iain Wright.

European Commissioner 
On 22 November 2004 Mandelson became Britain's European Commissioner, taking the trade portfolio.

In October 2008 he left his post as Trade Commissioner to return to UK politics. As a former EU Commissioner, Mandelson was entitled to a £31,000 pension upon reaching the age of 65 years. It was claimed by Christopher Hope of The Daily Telegraph  in 2009 that Mandelson's pension was contingent on a "duty of loyalty to the Communities", which also applied after his term in office. The TaxPayers' Alliance, which was reported to have uncovered the threat to his pension, demanded that he should declare the conflict of interest and either relinquish his EU pay cheques or resign as a minister. "When one considers that his new ministerial post deals specifically with business, enterprise and regulatory reform – all areas that are intimately involved with EU legislation, regulation and policy –" the group said, "the conflict of interest is even more stark." Mandelson did not agree that he had a conflict of interests. "He has always had a clear view of British interests and how they are secured by our EU membership," a spokesperson said.

The website Full Fact reported in 2019 that the claim was untrue, stating that while there are rules governing the conduct of current and former EU staff members, which can lead to pensions sanctions, the European Commission had informed them that it would be "probably impossible" for such people to lose their pension for criticising the EU or supporting Brexit. Full Fact also pointed out that there had been multiple cases of both current and ex-commissioners criticising the EU – in April 2019, German former Commissioner Günter Verheugen criticised the EU's Brexit negotiating position, saying "the problem is on the EU side", while in 2017 British former Commissioner Lord Hill had supported "getting on" with Brexit.

Peerage and return to Cabinet

On 3 October 2008, as part of Gordon Brown's Cabinet reshuffle, it was announced amid some controversy that Mandelson would return to Government in the re-designated post of Business Secretary and would be raised to the peerage, thus becoming a member of the House of Lords. On 13 October 2008 he was created Baron Mandelson, of Foy in the County of Herefordshire and of Hartlepool in the County of Durham, and was introduced in the House of Lords the same day.

Following his return to office, Mandelson supported the planned Heathrow expansion. On 6 March 2009, environmental protester Leila Deen of anti-aviation group Plane Stupid approached him outside a summit on the government's low carbon industrial strategy and threw a cup of green custard in his face in protest over his support for a third runway at Heathrow Airport. The protester was cautioned on 9 April for causing "harassment, alarm or distress".

In a Cabinet reshuffle on 5 June 2009 Mandelson was granted the honorific title of First Secretary of State and appointed Lord President of the Council; it was also announced that the Department for Innovation, Universities and Skills would be merged into his, giving him the new title of Secretary of State for Business, Innovation and Skills and that he would continue as President of the Board of Trade.

Mandelson was a member of 35 of the 43 Cabinet committees and subcommittees.

In August 2009 Mandelson was widely reported to have ordered "technical measures" such as internet disconnection to be included in the draft of the Digital Economy Act 2010 after a "big lobbying operation", even though the Digital Britain report had rejected this type of punishment. The Independent reported that according to their Whitehall sources, Mandelson was persuaded that tough laws were needed to reduce online copyright infringement following an intensive lobbying campaign by influential people in the music and film industry. The paper also reported that this included a meeting with DreamWorks co-founder David Geffen at the Rothschild family villa on the Greek island of Corfu. Mandelson's spokesperson claimed that there had been no discussion of internet piracy during the Corfu dinner and suggested that the decision to reverse Lord Carter's findings had been taken in late July before the trip. The Times reported after the Corfu meeting that an unnamed Whitehall source had confirmed that before this trip, Mandelson had shown little personal interest in the Digital Britain agenda, which has been ongoing for several years. According to the source of The Times, Mandelson returned from holiday and effectively issued an edict that the regulation needed to be tougher.

In August 2011 a Freedom of Information (FOI) request showed that Mandelson had decided to approve the inclusion of technical measures, such as the disconnection of internet access, at least two months before public consultation had finished and that he had shown little interest in the consultation. Letters from Mandelson's office document talks with Lucian Grainge, CEO of Universal Music Group, on 2 June 2009 and that on the following day Mandelson advised Lord Carter about the "possibility of [the Secretary of State] having a power to direct Ofcom to go directly to introduce technical measures". Mandelson made the formal announcement that technical measures, including disconnection, were to be included in the Digital Economy Bill two months later on 7 August 2009.

An opinion poll conducted by the centre-left think tank Compass found in March 2009 that Mandelson was less disliked by party members than Deputy Leader Harriet Harman. This was felt to be unusual as Mandelson "historically has been unpopular among Labour members". Tony Blair's assertion in 1996 that "my project will be complete when the Labour Party learns to love Peter Mandelson" was seen as prophetic in late September 2009 when Mandelson was enthusiastically received at the party conference in Brighton.

Post-Cabinet career 
After the Labour Party lost the 2010 general election, Mandelson's memoirs, The Third Man: Life at the Heart of New Labour, were published in July 2010, two months after leaving office. The memoirs were subsequently criticised by Labour leadership contenders Ed and David Miliband and Andy Burnham. During this time he was appointed President of the international think tank Policy Network.

In November 2010, Mandelson and Benjamin Wegg-Prosser founded Global Counsel, a consultancy firm based in London, with the financial support of WPP, the advertising giant. The firm provides advice for corporate strategists and senior management worldwide. Mandelson has been criticised for so far not disclosing his clients.

In 1999, 2008, 2009, 2011, 2012, 2013 and 2014 Mandelson was an invited guest of the Bilderberg Group and attended the annual conferences.

In January 2011, it was announced that Mandelson would serve as a senior adviser to the advisory investment banking firm, Lazard. In 2013, he also joined the Board of Trustees of Deutsche Bank's Alfred Herrhausen Gesellschaft. In May 2011 it was revealed that there was speculation that Mandelson had been approached by China to be a candidate for the leadership of the International Monetary Fund, even though Mandelson had not been a finance minister or headed a central bank. However, it was then speculated that Mandelson would stand to succeed Pascal Lamy as Director-General of the World Trade Organization, backed by David Cameron.

In May 2012, Mandelson confirmed that he was advising Asia Pulp & Paper (APP) in selling timber products to Europe. In 2012 APP was accused of illegal logging in Indonesia and damaging the habitats of rare animals such as the Sumatran tiger. At least 67 companies worldwide, such as Tesco and Kraft Foods since 2004 and Danone since 2012 have boycotted APP.

In 2013, Mandelson was appointed to the revived post of High Steward of Hull, a ceremonial position held by his grandfather Herbert Morrison in 1956–65 and defunct since 1974.

Labour leadership of Jeremy Corbyn
After the 2015 Labour leadership election resulted in Jeremy Corbyn becoming the party leader, Mandelson stated that he believed that Labour was now unelectable, but advised party members unhappy with the situation to wait for Corbyn to demonstrate this before working to replace him. He wished for an early general election to force Corbyn out. In February 2017, he said Corbyn had "no idea in the 21st century how to conduct himself as a leader of a party putting itself forward in a democratic election" and "I work every single day to bring forward the end of [Corbyn's] tenure in office".

After the results of the 2017 general election became known, Mandelson conceded that Corbyn's election campaign was "very sure footed" and the result, in which Labour gained seats and denied the Conservatives a majority, unexpected. "I was wrong" about Corbyn, he told BBC News. "I am very surprised, an earthquake has happened in British politics and I did not foresee it", although he doubted Corbyn's ability to gain a Commons majority. Two years later, in the 2019 general election, Labour suffered their worst defeat since the 1930s. Mandelson described the result as "not undeserved", arguing that Corbyn's leadership was one of the main reasons for Labour's defeat.

Remain campaign 
During the 2016 EU referendum, Mandelson sat on the board on Britain Stronger in Europe, the official "Remain" campaign. The campaign was unsuccessful.

Following the referendum, Mandelson was an outspoken supporter of a second referendum.

WTO lobbying
After Roberto Azevêdo announced he would step down as Director-General of the World Trade Organisation (WTO) in September 2020, Mandelson declared his interest in running to succeed him. He proceeded to lobby governments around the world for the job, arguing that the WTO had "reached a fork in the road" and had to be "picked up and put back on its feet". Mandelson was overlooked in favour of the Conservative Liam Fox due to his opposition to Brexit. His candidacy ended when Fox beat him to win the nomination of the UK government.

Labour leadership of Keir Starmer
In 2021 it was reported that Mandelson had been advising Labour leader Keir Starmer on moving the party beyond Corbyn's leadership and broadening its electoral appeal.

Controversies 
During the 2009 expenses scandal The Daily Telegraph raised questions about the timing of Mandelson's second home allowance claim, dating from 2004, saying, "Lord Mandelson billed the taxpayer for almost £3,000 of work on his constituency home in Hartlepool less than a week after announcing his decision to stand down as an MP." Mandelson said in a statement, "The work done was necessary maintenance. All claims made were reasonable and submitted consistent with parliamentary rules."

On 22 April 2005 The Times revealed that Mandelson had spent the previous New Year's Eve on the yacht of Paul Allen, the co-founder of Microsoft, which was at the centre of a major EU investigation and although it did not allege impropriety, it did state that Mandelson's visit was inappropriate for a serving European Commissioner.

During the summer of 2008 Mandelson had a widely publicised disagreement with Nicolas Sarkozy, President of France. Sarkozy accused him of trying to sell out European farmers and appeared to blame his handling of the Doha round of trade talks for the "no" vote in the Irish referendum on the Treaty of Lisbon. Mandelson said his position at world trade talks had been undermined and told the BBC he did not start the row, saying, "I stood up for myself, I'm not to be bullied." He said he believed the row was over but renewed his warnings on protectionism.

In 2008 Mandelson was hospitalised, suffering from a kidney stone. At this time, melamine added to milk in China had caused kidney stones and other ailments in thousands of Chinese children, killing at least six. Ironically, during the previous week Mandelson had drunk a glass of Chinese yoghurt in front of reporters in order to show his confidence in Chinese dairy products, although his own kidney stones were unrelated.

In October 2008 Mandelson was reported to have maintained private contacts over several years with Russian oligarch Oleg Deripaska, most recently on holiday in August 2008 on Deripaska's yacht at Taverna Agni on the Greek island of Corfu. News of the contacts sparked criticism because, as European Union Trade Commissioner, Mandelson had been responsible for two decisions to cut aluminium tariffs that had benefited Deripaska's United Company Rusal. Mandelson denied that there had been a conflict of interest and insisted that he had never discussed aluminium tariffs with Deripaska. On 26 October 2008 the Shadow Foreign Secretary William Hague claimed the "whole country" wanted "transparency" about Mandelson's previous meetings with Deripaska. In response, Prime Minister Gordon Brown said Mandelson's dealings with Deripaska had been "found to be above board". Mandelson said that meeting business figures from "across the range" in emerging economies was part of his brief as EU Trade Commissioner. On 29 October 2008, while Mandelson was on a ministerial visit to Moscow, it was alleged in the British press that Valery Pechenkin, the head of security at Deripaska's company Basic Element, had organised a swift entry visa for Mandelson when he turned up in Moscow to visit Deripaska in 2005.

In June 2013, writing for the Progress website, Mandelson warned Labour it risked harming its election chances if affiliated trade unions continued to "manipulate parliamentary selections" as was alleged in the 2013 Labour Party Falkirk candidate selection controversy.

In April 2014, it was reported that Mandelson had strong ties to Russian conglomerate Sistema.

In 2019, UK's Channel 4 aired an episode of Dispatches where a source close to Epstein claimed that Peter Mandelson (while serving as a UK Cabinet Minister) made a phonecall to Epstein while he was in prison after pleading guilty for trafficking minors in order to set up a meeting with Jamie Dimon, CEO of JP Morgan. In a statement, lawyers for Mandelson said: “Our client has no recollection of a telephone conversation with Mr Epstein in January 2009. He talked to bank CEOs on a regular basis, including Mr Dimon. These contacts were arranged through his office.”

Non-political commitments 
Mandelson was, until 8 October 2008, the President of Central School of Speech and Drama. He was replaced in this un-remunerated post by playwright Harold Pinter, who died two months later.

In 2011, Mandelson was guest of honour at Herbert Morrison Primary School in Vauxhall, South London. The school was hosting a special themed day in honour of Mandelson's grandfather, Herbert Morrison, after whom the school was named.

Personal life

Partner and sexuality 
Mandelson is gay and he is said to be 'intensely private' about his personal life. During his time as a former government leader, the press – tabloid and broadsheet alike – often portrayed Mandelson as effeminate through "the linguistic resources of camp" and narcissistic – sometimes including coded references to homosexual acts in their descriptions of his actions.

He has lived with his partner Reinaldo Avila da Silva, a Brazilian translator, since March 1998.

Attempted outings and harassment 
While his sexual orientation was known to friends, colleagues and constituents, in 1987 the News of the World ran an issue that attempted to out Mandelson as gay. Mandelson preferred to keep his personal life private and as such did not respond. Mandelson was outed again by Matthew Parris in 1998 on the BBC programme Newsnight. This led to press harassment of his partner, with the Daily Express sending a reporter to take pictures of him while he was at his languages course.

An internal investigation later found that the photos had been obtained without Avila da Silva's consent and images of him attempting to cover his face had been secretly deleted. Mandelson phoned the BBC and the Press Complaints Commission following Newsnight broadcast, and an internal memo was later sent within the BBC, stating that "Under no circumstances whatsoever should allegations about the private life of Peter Mandelson be repeated or referred to on any broadcast."

In the media
 BBC Four's Storyville in 2010, Mandelson: The Real PM?, directed by Hannah Rothschild, a fly on the wall documentary about Mandelson as Business Secretary in the run up to the 2010 general election.
 Mandelson was portrayed by Paul Rhys in the 2003 Channel 4 drama The Deal.
 Mandelson was portrayed by Mark Gatiss in the 2015 Channel 4 drama Coalition.
 Mandelson was portrayed by Nigel Planer in the 2011 comedy drama The Hunt for Tony Blair.
 The Little Britain character Sebastian Love was based on Mandelson

Honours
  Officer, Legion of Honour (2017)
 Life peerage (2008)

Bibliography
 (with Roger Liddle) The Blair Revolution: Can New Labour Deliver? Faber, 1996  ; The Blair Revolution Revisited, (2nd ed), Politicos, 2002, 
 (contributor) The City in Europe and the World, European Research Forum at London Metropolitan University, 2006 
 The Third Man: Life at the Heart of New Labour Harper Press, 2010

Notes

References

Further reading
 Jones, Nicholas (2000): Sultans of Spin: The Media and the New Labour Government Orion Books, 
 Macintyre, Donald (1999): Mandelson: The Biography HarperCollins, 
 Rawnsley, Andrew (2001): Servants of the People: The Inside Story of New Labour Penguin Books, 
 Routledge, Paul (1999): Mandy: The Unauthorised Biography of Peter Mandelson Simon & Schuster, 
 Seldon, Anthony (2005): Blair The Free Press,

Works
 Mandelson, Peter (1997): Labour's next steps Fabian Society
 Mandelson, Peter (2002): The Blair Revolution Revisited Politico's,

External links

 Lord Mandelson, former MP – They Work For You 
 Peter Mandelson profile at UK Parliament
 Peter Mandelson | Financial Times
 Policy Network
 Profile: Peter Mandelson BBC News, 3 October 2008, 13 August 2004
 Peter Mandelson: Interview in full, PublicAffairsAsia.com, 18 August 2008, on sovereign wealth funds
 Peter Mandelson: Interview on New Statesman, 1 October 2008.
 
 
 Social Democracy Observatory
 
 
 
 
 Peter Mandelson | Politics | The Guardian

|-

|-

|-

|-

|-

|-

|-

|-

1953 births
Living people
Alumni of St Catherine's College, Oxford
British European Commissioners
Councillors in the London Borough of Lambeth
English socialists
English male non-fiction writers
English people of Polish-Jewish descent
English political writers
First Secretaries of State of the United Kingdom
Gay politicians
Labour Party (UK) life peers
Labour Party (UK) MPs for English constituencies
Labour Party (UK) officials
LGBT life peers
LGBT members of the Parliament of the United Kingdom
English LGBT politicians
Lord Presidents of the Council
Members of the Privy Council of the United Kingdom
New Labour
People educated at Hendon School
People from Hendon
Politics of the Borough of Hartlepool
Secretaries of State for Northern Ireland
UK MPs 1992–1997
UK MPs 1997–2001
UK MPs 2001–2005
Writers from London
Officiers of the Légion d'honneur
Presidents of the Board of Trade
Hartlepool United F.C. non-playing staff
Life peers created by Elizabeth II